The 2006 FIFA World Cup qualification UEFA Group 7 was a UEFA qualifying group for the 2006 FIFA World Cup. The group comprised Belgium, Bosnia and Herzegovina, Lithuania, San Marino, Serbia and Montenegro and Spain.

The group was won by Serbia and Montenegro, who qualified for the 2006 FIFA World Cup. The runners-up Spain entered the UEFA qualification play-offs.

Standings

Results

Goalscorers

6 goals

 Fernando Torres

5 goals

 Elvir Bolić
 Mateja Kežman

4 goals

 Zvonimir Vukić

3 goals

 Koen Daerden
 Sergej Barbarez
 Edgaras Jankauskas
 Raúl

2 goals

 Thomas Buffel
 Émile Mpenza
 Mbo Mpenza
 Timmy Simons
 Daniel Van Buyten
 Hasan Salihamidžić
 Andy Selva
 Nenad Jestrović
 Dejan Stanković
 Albert Luque
 Sergio Ramos

1 goal

 Karel Geraerts
 Wesley Sonck
 Kevin Vandenbergh
 Zlatan Bajramović
 Zvjezdan Misimović
 Deividas Česnauskis
 Tomas Danilevičius
 Andrius Gedgaudas
 Marius Stankevičius
 Saša Ilić
 Ognjen Koroman
 Savo Milošević
 Guti
 Asier del Horno
 Joaquín
 Antonio López
 Carlos Marchena
 Vicente Rodríguez

1 own goal

 Olivier Deschacht (playing against Lithuania)

7
2004–05 in Bosnia and Herzegovina football
2005–06 in Bosnia and Herzegovina football
2004–05 in Spanish football
Qual
2004–05 in Belgian football
2005–06 in Belgian football
2004–05 in San Marino football
2005–06 in San Marino football
2004–05 in Serbian football
2004–05 in Montenegrin football
Qual
2004 in Lithuanian football
2005 in Lithuanian football